Sphingobacterium lactis is a Gram-negative and rod-shaped bacterium from the genus of Sphingobacterium which has been isolated from raw milk in Bavaria in Germany.

References

External links
Type strain of Sphingobacterium lactis at BacDive -  the Bacterial Diversity Metadatabase	

Sphingobacteriia
Bacteria described in 2012